Robert "Bobby" C. Sanchez (born February 15, 1961) is an American politician serving as a member of the Connecticut House of Representatives from the 25th district. Elected in November 2010, he assumed office in 2011.

Early life and education 
Sanchez was born in New Britain, Connecticut in 1961. He earned a Bachelor of Arts and Master of Arts degree from Springfield College.

Career 
Outside of politics, Sanchez works as a case manager for the  Human Resources Agency of New Britain. He also served as a member of the New Britain Democratic Town Committee, the New Britain Human Rights Commission, and New Britain Housing Coalition Board. Sanchez was elected to the Connecticut House of Representatives in November 2010 and assumed office in 2011. During his tenure, Sanchez has served as vice chair and co-chair of the House Education Committee. Sanchez was a candidate for mayor of New Britain, Connecticut in November 2021, losing to incumbent Erin Stewart.

Personal life 
Sanchez and his wife, Nebeska Sanchez, have one son.

See also
Connecticut's 27th House of Representatives district

References 

1961 births
Living people
People from New Britain, Connecticut
Springfield College (Massachusetts) alumni
Democratic Party members of the Connecticut House of Representatives
Hispanic and Latino American state legislators in Connecticut